Richard "Raahu" Gavalis is a music producer who has produced several well-known albums. He currently works out of his studio, Dome Studios in Royersford, Pennsylvania, which he purchased from founder David Ivory in 1992, as Ivory was leaving to work in Sigma Sound Studios.

Partial discography


Bloodhound Gang
One Fierce Beer Coaster
Hooray for Boobies
Hefty Fine

Last Martyrs of a Lost Cause
Sunrays to Starlight (2008)
Don't shoot the messenger EP (2006)

Long Shot Hero
Regrets No More (2005)

Others
Corey Feldman – Former Child Actor (2002)
Artful Brothers-''Cinematic Themes for Enhanced Listening (2019)

References

External links
Dome Sound Studios
Rich Gavalis on Allmusic

Record producers from Pennsylvania
American audio engineers
Year of birth missing (living people)
Living people
Place of birth missing (living people)
People from Montgomery County, Pennsylvania
Engineers from Pennsylvania